The WWC Puerto Rico Championship is the secondary professional wrestling championship that is defended by the World Wrestling Council based in Puerto Rico. The title was created in January 1974 and, as its name suggests, is defended exclusively within Puerto Rico. Overall, the title has been possessed by seventy-five different wrestlers throughout the title's existence. The first champion was José Miguel Pérez, who was billed as champion upon the title's creation. He also holds the longest reign, at 426 days. Invader I holds the record for most reigns at 12.

Belt designs
The belt and its design have been changed several times for a number of reasons.

The location represented in the title's name has changed twice, both times in unofficial fashion after being rechristened and modified by its current holder in under to sell a villainous persona. During Fidel Sierra's second reign, which began on June 2, 2001, and lasted for three months, he defended the title under the name of "Cuba Heavyweight Championship". To illustrate this change, he covered the word "Puerto Rico" in the main banner with a sticker that was inscribed with the word "Cuba", also covering the map of Puerto Rico that was featured in the center of the plate with a sticker of the flag of Cuba. Sierra also covered the side plates with photos of him and his manager, Fantasy. All of these changes were reverted as soon as he lost the title. After winning the title on September 10, 2005, Brent Dail defended it as the "51st State Championship", a reference to the statehood movement and its intention to annex Puerto Rico as the 51st state of the United States. Like Sierra, he covered the main banner with a sticker inscribed with "51st State" and flanked the main plate with additional stickers featuring the acronym "USA". The stickers were removed by the following champion as soon as he won the title, reverting the changes.

Title history 

|-
!1
|José Miguel Pérez
|January 6, 1974
|House show
|Guaynabo, Puerto Rico
|1
|
|align="left"|Billed as champion on WWC's first show.
|
|-
!2
|Dr. Klodied
|March 8, 1975
|House show
|Caguas, Puerto Rico
|1
|
|
|
|-
!3
|José Miguel Pérez
|March 22, 1975
|House show
|Bayamón, Puerto Rico
|2
|
|
|
|-

|-
!4
|José Miguel Pérez
|September 20, 1975
|House show
|Caguas, Puerto Rico
|3
|
|align="left"| Pérez defeated Spoiler II to win the vacant title.
|
|-
!5
|Tosh Togo
|October 4, 1975
|House show
|Bayamón, Puerto Rico
|1
|
|
|
|-

|-
!6
|Hercules Ayala
|February 21, 1976
|House show
|Bayamón, Puerto Rico
|1
|
|align="left"|Defeat Spoiler I in tournament final.
|
|-
!7
|Tor Kamata
|May 22, 1976
|House show
|Caguas, Puerto Rico
|1
|
|
|
|-
!8
|José Rivera
|August 21, 1976
|House show
|Caguas, Puerto Rico
|1
|
|
|
|-
!9
|Eric The Red
|December 25, 1976
|House show
|Bayamón, Puerto Rico
|1
|
|
|
|- 

|-
!10
|José Miguel Pérez
|May 7, 1977
|House show
|Bayamón, Puerto Rico
|4
|
|align="left"|Defeated Huracan Castillo tournament final.
|
|-
!11
|Huracán Castillo
|May 14, 1977
|House show
|Caguas, Puerto Rico
|1
|
|
|
|-
!12
|Hercules Ayala
|June 18, 1977
|House show
|Caguas, Puerto Rico
|2
|
|
|
|-
!13
|Invader I
|September 24, 1977
|House show
|Bayamón, Puerto Rico
|1
|
|
|
|-
!14
|Carlos Colón
|October 15, 1977
|House show
|Bayamón, Puerto Rico
|1
|
|
|
|-
!15
|Ox Baker
|April 8, 1978
|House show
|Caguas, Puerto Rico
|1
|
|
|
|-
!16
|Carlos Colón
|May 6, 1978
|House show
|Bayamón, Puerto Rico
|2
|
|
|
|-
!17
|Kengo Kimura
|July 15, 1978
|House show
|Caguas, Puerto Rico
|1
|
|
|
|-
!18
|Carlos Colón
|August 12, 1978
|House show
|Caguas, Puerto Rico
|3
|
|
|
|-
!19
|Abdullah the Butcher
|November 18, 1978
|House show
|Bayamón, Puerto Rico
|1
|
|
|
|-
!20
|Pampero Firpo
|July 31, 1979
|House show
|Bayamón, Puerto Rico
|1
|
|
|
|- 

|-
!21
|Carlos Colón
|September 22, 1979
|House show
|Bayamón, Puerto Rico
|4
|
|align="left"|Defeated Pampero Firpo in rematch to win the vacant title.
|
|-
!22
|Abdullah the Butcher
|December 15, 1979
|House show
|Bayamón, Puerto Rico
|2
|
|
|
|- 

|-
!23
|Carlos Colón
|January 12, 1980
|House show
|Bayamón, Puerto Rico
|5
|
|align="left"|Defeated Abdullah the Butcher in a rematch to win the vacant title.
|
|- 

|-
!24
|Carlos Colón
|May 9, 1981
|House show
|Bayamón, Puerto Rico
|6
|
|align="left"|Defeated Killer Karl Krupp to win the vacant title.
|
|-
!25
|Abdullah the Butcher
|August 10, 1981
|House show
|San Juan, Puerto Rico
|3
|
|
|
|-
!26
|Carlos Colón
|September 26, 1981
|House show
|Bayamón, Puerto Rico
|7
|
|
|
|-
!27
|Mongolian Stomper
|February 6, 1982
|House show
|Bayamón, Puerto Rico
|1
|
|
|
|-
!28
|Carlos Colón
|March 13, 1982
|House show
|Bayamón, Puerto Rico
|8
|
|
|
|- 

|-
!29
|Dory Funk Jr.
|August 14, 1982
|House show
|Bayamon, Puerto Rico
|1
|
|align="left"|Defeat Pierre Martel in a tournament final.
|
|-
!30
|Invader I
|October 16, 1982
|House show
|San Juan, Puerto Rico
|2
|
|align="left"|Invader I also won the WWC North American Heavyweight Championship on March 27, 1982. He later defeated Dory Funk, Jr. in a double title Texas death match for both WWC North American Championship and the WWC Puerto Rico Heavyweight Championship.
|
|-
!31
|King Tonga
|January 15, 1983
|House show
|San Juan, Puerto Rico
|1
|
|
|
|-
!32
|Bob Sweetan
|October 23, 1983
|House show
|Mayagüez, Puerto Rico
|1
|
|
|
|-
!33
|King Tonga
|March 24, 1984
|House show
|Bayamón, Puerto Rico
|2
|
|
|
|-
!34
|Terry Gibbs
|May 12, 1984
|House show
|Bayamón, Puerto Rico
|1
|
|
|
|-
!35
|Hercules Ayala
|June 14, 1984
|House show
|Bayamón, Puerto Rico
|3
|
|
|
|-
!36
|Konga The Barbarian
|July 7, 1984
|House show
|Bayamón, Puerto Rico
|1
|
|
|
|-
!37
|Invader I
|September 15, 1984
|House show
|San Juan, Puerto Rico
|3
|
|
|
|-
!38
|Black Gordman
|December 6, 1984
|House show
|Bayamón, Puerto Rico
|1
|
|
|
|-
!39
|Super Médico I
|April 10, 1985
|House show
|Aguadilla, Puerto Rico
|1
|
|
|
|-
!40
|Fidel Sierra
|June 8, 1985
|House show
|Caguas, Puerto Rico
|1
|
|
|
|-
!41
|Super Médico I
|July 6, 1985
|House show
|Carolina, Puerto Rico
|2
|
|
|
|-
!42
|Eric Embry
|August 17, 1985
|House show
|Bayamón, Puerto Rico
|1
|
|
|
|-
!43
|Super Médico I
|May 17, 1986
|House show
|Caguas, Puerto Rico
|3
||
|
|-
!44
|Eric Embry
|May 31, 1986
|House show
|Bayamón, Puerto Rico
|2
|
|
|
|-
!45
|Invader I
|June 28, 1986
|House show
|Bayamón, Puerto Rico
|4
|
|
|
|-
!46
|Al Pérez
|October 22, 1986
|House show
|San Juan, Puerto Rico
|1
|
|
|
|-
!47
|Mighty Igor
|November 29, 1986
|House show
|San Juan, Puerto Rico
|1
|
|
|
|-
!48
|Kareem Mumhammad
|June 6, 1987
|House show
|Guaynabo, Puerto Rico
|1
|
|
|
|-
!49
|Miguel Perez, Jr.
|December 13, 1987
|House show
|San Juan, Puerto Rico
|1
|
|
|
|-
!50
|Super Black Ninja
|May 14, 1988
|House show
|Caguas, Puerto Rico
|1
|
|
|
|-
!51
|Ricky Santana
|August 6, 1988
|House show
|San Juan, Puerto Rico
|1
|
|
|
|-
!52
|Bobby Jaggers
|October 8, 1988
|House show
|Carolina, Puerto Rico
|1
|
|
|
|-
!53
|Ricky Santana
|November 24, 1988
|House show
|Carolina, Puerto Rico
|2
|
|
|
|-
!54
|Hercules Ayala
|December 17, 1988
|House show
|Bayamón, Puerto Rico
|4
|
|
|
|- 

|-
!55
|TNT
|February 4, 1989
|House show
|Bayamón, Puerto Rico
|1
|
|align="left"|Defeat Sika in a tournament final.
|
|-
!56
|Abudda Dein
|February 25, 1989
|House show
|Carolina, Puerto Rico
|1
|
|
|
|-
!57
|Invader I
|May 14, 1989
|House show
|San Juan, Puerto Rico
|5
|
|
|
|-
!58
|Ivan Koloff
|July 15, 1989
|House show
|Caguas, Puerto Rico
|1
|
|
|
|-
!59
|Invader I
|October 7, 1989
|House show
|Bayamón, Puerto Rico
|6
|
|
|
|-
!60
|Manny Fernandez
|January 13, 1990
|House show
|Bayamón, Puerto Rico
|1
|
|
|
|- 

|-
!61
|Don Kernodle
|July 3, 1990
|House Show
|Bayamón, Puerto Rico
|1
| 
|align="left"|Won a 20-man battle royal.
|
|-
!62
|Héctor Guerrero
|December 8, 1990
|House Show
|Maunabo, Puerto Rico
|1
|
|
|
|-
| colspan="9" style="text-align:center; background:#cfc;"|AWF Puerto Rico Heavyweight Championship
|-
!63
|Huracán Castillo, Jr.
|October 12, 1991
|House show
|Bayamón, Puerto Rico
|1
|
|
|
|-
!64
|Miguel Pérez, Jr.
|November 15, 1991
|House show
|Bayamón, Puerto Rico
|2
|
|
|
|-
!65
|Huracán Castillo, Jr.
|December 16, 1991
|House show
|Bayamón, Puerto Rico
|2
|
|
|
|- 

|-
!66
|Steve Corino
|December 5, 1992
|House show
|Luquillo, Puerto Rico
|1
|
|align="left"|
|
|- 
!67
|Jake Roberts
|June 5, 1993
|House show
|Caguas, Puerto Rico
|1
|
|
|
|- 

|-
| colspan="9" style="text-align:center; background:#cfc;"|WWC Puerto Rico Heavyweight Championship
|-
!68
|Ray González
|August 6, 1994
|House show
|Carolina, Puerto Rico
|1
|
|align="left"|Defeat Jason The Terrible in a tournament final to win the vacant title. The exact length of the reign is uncertain.
|
|-
!69
|Jason the Terrible
|February 25, 1995
|House show
|San Lorenzo, Puerto Rico
|1
|
|
|
|-
!70
|Invader I
|June 17, 1995
|House show
|N/A
|7
|
|
|
|-
!71
|El Bronco I
|November 18, 1995
|House show
|Bayamón, Puerto Rico
|1
|
|
|
|-
!72
|Invader I
|January 6, 1996
|House show
|San Juan, Puerto Rico
|8
|
|
|
|-
!73
|Huracán Castillo, Jr.
|June 8, 1996
|House show
|Arroyo, Puerto Rico
|3
|
|
|
|- 

|-
!74
|Ray González
|December 15, 1996
|House show
|Caguas, Puerto Rico
|2
|
|align="left"|Defeat Castillo in a rematch.
|
|-
!75
|Huracán Castillo, Jr.
|March 29, 1997
|House show
|Bayamón, Puerto Rico
|4
|
|
|
|-
!76
|Ray González
|April 27, 1997
|House show
|Cabo Rojo, Puerto Rico
|3
|
|
|
|-
!77
|Mohammed Hussein
|May 28, 1997
|House show
|Gurabo, Puerto Rico
|1
|
|
|
|-
!77
|Ricky Santana
|September 6, 1997
|House show
|Humacao, Puerto Rico
|3
|
|
|
|-
!78
|Villano III
|November 27, 1997
|House show
|Caguas, Puerto Rico
|1
|
|
|
|-
!79
|Ricky Santana
|November 29, 1997
|House show
|Arecibo, Puerto Rico
|4
|
|
|
|-
!80
|Villano III
|December 21, 1997
|House show
|San Germán, Puerto Rico
|2
|
|
|
|-
!81
|Glamour Boy Shane
|August 1, 1998
|WWC 25th Aniversario 
|San Juan, Puerto Rico
|1
|
|
|
|-
!82
|Victor The Bodyguard
|October 31, 1998
|House show
|Ponce, Puerto Rico
|1
|
|
|
|-
!83
|Carlos Colón
|February 20, 1999
|House show
|Humacao, Puerto Rico
|9
|
|
|
|- 

|-
!84
|José Rivera, Jr.
|July 10, 1999
|House show
|Guaynabo, Puerto Rico
|1
|
|align="left"|Defeated Victor The Bodyguard in a tournament final to win the vacant title.
|
|-
!85
|Mustafa Saed
|September 11, 1999
|House show
|Fajardo, Puerto Rico
|1
|
|
|
|-
!86
|El Nene
|October 23, 1999
|House show
|Manatí, Puerto Rico
|1
|
|Pinned "Mr.Hardcore"Rico Suave in a handicap match.
|
|-
!87
|Harley Lewis
|November 11, 1999
|House show
|Cayey, Puerto Rico
|1
|
|
|
|-
!88
|José Rivera, Jr.
|January 19, 2000
|House show
|Carolina, Puerto Rico
|2
|
|
|
|-
!89
|Rex King
|February 12, 2000
|House show
|Guaynabo, Puerto Rico
|1
|
|
|
|-
!90
|Titán
|March 26, 2000
|House show
|Carolina, Puerto Rico
|1
|
|
|
|-
!91
|Invader I
|September 30, 2000
|House show
|Carolina, Puerto Rico
|9
|
|
|
|-
!92
|Paul LeDuc
|March 10, 2001
|House show
|Morovis, Puerto Rico
|1
|
|
|
|-
!93
|Invader I
|April 7, 2001
|House show
|Carolina, Puerto Rico
|10
|
|
|
|-
!94
|Fidel Sierra
|June 2, 2001
|IPW Hardcore Civil War 2001
|Morovis, Puerto Rico
|2
|
|
|
|-
!95
|Invader I
|September 9, 2001
|WWC 28th Aniversario: Septiembre Negro 
|Bayamón, Puerto Rico
|11
|
|
|
|-
!96
|Jim Steele
|November 3, 2001
|House show
|Carolina, Puerto Rico
|1
|
|
|
|-
!97
|Invader I
|November 24, 2001
|House show
|Caguas, Puerto Rico
|12
|
|
|
|-
!98
|Ray González
|February 9, 2002
|House show
|Caguas, Puerto Rico
|4
|
|
|
|-
!99
|Hercules Ayala
|March 9, 2002
|House show
|Carolina, Puerto Rico
|5
|
|
|
|-
!100
|Ray González
|March 23, 2002
|House show
|Orocovis, Puerto Rico
|5
|
|
|
|-
!101
|Rico Suave
|June 30, 2002
|House Show
|Carolina, Puerto Rico
|1
|
|
|
|-
!102
|El Nene
|July 25, 2002
|House Show
|San Juan, Puerto Rico
|2
|
|
|
|-
!103
|Ricky Santana
|November 28, 2002
|House show
|Mayagüez, Puerto Rico
|5
|
|
|
|-
!104
|El Nene
|December 14, 2002
|House show
|Caguas, Puerto Rico
|3
|
|
|
|-

|-
!105
|Fidel Sierra
|January 11, 2003
|House show
|Morovis, Puerto Rico
|3
|
|align="left"|Defeated El Nene to win the vacant title.
|
|-
!106
|El Nene
|January 18, 2003
|House show
|San Lorenzo, Puerto Rico
|4
|
|
|
|- 

|-
!106
|Eddie Colón
|May 31, 2003
|House show
|Carolina, Puerto Rico
|1
|
|align="left"|Defeated Dominican Boy in a tournament final to win the vacant title.
|
|-
!107
|Dominican Boy 
|June 7, 2003
|House show
|Cayey, Puerto Rico
|1
|
|
|
|- 

|-
!107
|José Rivera Jr.
|September 27, 2003
|House show
|Caguas, Puerto Rico
|3
|
|align="left"|Defeated Eddie Colón in a tournament final to win the vacant title.
|
|-
!108
|Eddie Colón
|October 25, 2003
|House show
|Cidra, Puerto Rico
|2
|
|
|
|-
!109
|José Rivera, Jr.
|November 15, 2003
|House show
|Guaynabo, Puerto Rico
|4
|
|
|
|-
!110
|Eddie Colón
|November 29, 2003
|House show
|Bayamón, Puerto Rico
|3
|
|
|
|-
!111
|José Rivera, Jr.
|December 20, 2003
|House show
|Caguas, Puerto Rico
|5
|
|
|
|- 

|-
!112
|José Rivera, Jr.
|January 3, 2004
|House show
|Bayamón, Puerto Rico
|6
|
|align="left"|Defeated Eddie Colón to win the vacant title.
|
|- 

|-
!113
|José Rivera, Jr.
|February 7, 2004
|House show
|Caguas, Puerto Rico
|7
|
|align="left"|Defeated Vengador Boricua to regain the title.
|
|-
!114
|Huracán Castillo, Jr.
|April 24, 2004
|House show
|Caguas, Puerto Rico
|5
|
|
|
|-
!115
|José Rivera, Jr.
|May 8, 2004
|House show
|Caguas, Puerto Rico
|8
|
|
|
|-
!116
|Huracán Castillo, Jr.
|May 15, 2004
|House show
|Caguas, Puerto Rico
|6
|
|align="left"|Huracán Castillo, Jr. won the title by forfeit when Rivera Jr. failed to show up to the show.
|
|-
!117
|Eddie Colón
|July 3, 2004
|House show
|Caguas, Puerto Rico
|4
|
|
|
|-
!118
|El Bronco I
|October 23, 2004
|House show
|Camuy, Puerto Rico
|2
|
|
|
|-
!119
|Eddie Colón
|November 6, 2004
|House show
|Guaynabo, Puerto Rico
|5
|
|align="left"|
|
|-
!120
|El Bronco I
|November 19, 2004
|House show
|Adjuntas, Puerto Rico
|3
|
|
|
|-
!121
|Eric Alexander
|December 11, 2004
|House show
|Caguas, Puerto Rico
|1
|
|
|
|-
!122
|La Amenaza Bryan
|March 26, 2005
|WWC Friday Madness
|Caguas, Puerto Rico
|1
|
|
|
|-
!123
|Chris Joel
|May 20, 2005
|WWC Friday Madness
|Bayamón, Puerto Rico
|1
|
|
|
|-
!124
|Brent Dail
|September 10, 2005
|House show
|Caguas, Puerto Rico
|1
|
|
|
|-
!125
|Abbad
|November 5, 2005
|WWC 32nd Aniversario 2005 
|Bayamón, Puerto Rico
|1
|
|
|
|-
!126
|Rico Suave
|December 10, 2005
|WWC Season Ending Tour 2005
|Bayamón, Puerto Rico
|2
|
|
|
|-
!127
|Abbad
|February 4, 2006
|WWC La Hora de la Verdad III
|Bayamón, Puerto Rico
|2
|
|align="left"|
|
|-
!128
|Rico Suave
|February 18, 2006
|House show
|Villalba, Puerto Rico
|3
|
|
|
|-
!129
|El Bronco I
|March 25, 2006
|House show
|Carolina, Puerto Rico
|4
|
|align="left"|
|
|-
!130
|Heartthrob Romeo
|April 15, 2006
|WWC Camino A La Glorida – Fase Especial
|Carolina, Puerto Rico
|1
|
|
|
|-
!131
|El Bronco I
|April 22, 2006
|House show
|Bayamón, Puerto Rico
|5
|
|align="left"|
|
|-
!132
|Alex Montalvo
|June 24, 2006
|WWC 2nd Annual Bruiser Brody Cup Tour 
|Bayamón, Puerto Rico
|1
|
|
|
|-
!133
|Fire Blaze
|September 9, 2006
|House show
|Ponce, Puerto Rico
|1
|
|Previously known as Fire Blazer
|
|-
!134
|Barrabás, Jr.
|November 4, 2006
|House show
|Salinas, Puerto Rico
|1
|
|align="left"|
|
|-
!135
|Fire Blaze
|December 17, 2006
|WWC Lockout
|Bayamón, Puerto Rico
|2
|
|align="left"|
|
|-
!136
|Alex Montalvo
|February 3, 2007
|House show
|Bayamón, Puerto Rico
|2
|
|
|
|-
!137
|Fire Blaze
|February 10, 2007
|House show
|Manatí, Puerto Rico
|3
|
|
|
|-
!138
|Ash Rubinsky
|March 24, 2007
|WWC Camino A La Gloria 2007
|Ponce, Puerto Rico
|1
|
|
|
|-
!139
|Fire Blaze
|April 7, 2007
|WWC Camino A La Gloria 2007
|Caguas, Puerto Rico
|4
|
|align="left"|
|
|-
!140
|Huracán Castillo, Jr.
|April 28, 2007
|House show
|Ponce, Puerto Rico
|7
|
|align="left"|
|
|-
!141
|Crazy Rudy
|October 6, 2007
|House show
|Ponce, Puerto Rico
|1
|
|
|
|-
!142
|"Jumping" Jeff Jeffrey
|October 27, 2007
|House show
|Ponce, Puerto Rico
|1
|
|
|
|- 

|-
!143
|BJ
|July 19, 2008
|WWC 35th Aniversario 2008
|San Juan, Puerto Rico
|1
|
|align="left"|
|
|-
!144
|Tommy Diablo
|August 9, 2008
|House show
|Bayamón, Puerto Rico
|1
|
|
|
|-
!145
|BJ
|December 13, 2008
|WWC Lockout 2008
|Bayamón, Puerto Rico
|2
|
|
|
|-
!146
|Charles Evans
|February 14, 2009
|House show
|Manatí, Puerto Rico
|1
|
|align="left"|
|
|-
!147
|BJ
|March 6, 2009
|House show
|Ponce, Puerto Rico
|3
|
|align="left"|
|
|-
!148
|Idol Stevens
|May 16, 2009
|WWC Honor vs. Traicion 2009 Tour
|Caguas, Puerto Rico
|1
|
|
|
|-
!149
|Glamour Boy Shane
|August 8, 2009
|House show
|Aibonito, Puerto Rico
|2
|
|
|
|-
!150
|Orlando Colón
|September 26, 2009
|WWC Septiembre Negro Tour
|Bayamón, Puerto Rico
|5
|
|align="left"|
|
|-
!151
|El Sensacional Carlitos
|February 27, 2010
|House show
|Ponce, Puerto Rico
|1
|
|
|
|-
!152
|Orlando Colón
|July 11, 2010
|WWC 37th Aniversario 2010 Weekend
|Bayamón, Puerto Rico
|6
|
|
|
|-
!153
|El Sensacional Carlitos
|September 25, 2010
|WWC Septiembre Negro
|Bayamón, Puerto Rico
|2
|
|align="left"|This was a steel cage match.
|
|-
!154
|Black Pain
|October 23, 2010
|WWC Halloween Wrestling Xtravanza
|Bayamón, Puerto Rico
|1
|
|
|
|-
!155
|El Sensacional Carlitos
|November 13, 2010
|House Show
|Bayamón, Puerto Rico
|3
|
|
|
|-
!156
|Gilbert
|November 27, 2010
|House Show
|Bayamón, Puerto Rico
|1
|
|
|
|-
!157
|El Sensacional Carlitos
|December 12, 2010
|WWC Lockout
|Bayamón, Puerto Rico
|4
|
|
|
|-
!158
|Hideo Saito
|February 19, 2011
|House show
|Carolina, Puerto Rico
|1
|
|
|
|-
!159
|Glamour Boy Shane
|March 26, 2011
|House show
|Bayamón, Puerto Rico
|3
|
|
|
|-
!160
|Gilbert
|May 14, 2011
|WWC Crossfire
|Bayamón, Puerto Rico
|2
|
|
|
|-
!161
|El Sensacional Carlitos
|September 3, 2011
|House Show
|Bayamón, Puerto Rico
|5
|
|align="left"|Title awarded after Gilbert no shows in a match.
|
|-
!162
|Gilbert
|September 10, 2011
|House Show
|Carolina, Puerto Rico
|3
|
|
|
|-

|-
!163
|Johnny Ringo
|March 4, 2012
|House show
|Bayamón, Puerto Rico
|1
|
|align="left"| 
|
|-
!164
|La Amenaza Bryan
|April 28, 2012
|House show
|Guaynabo, Puerto Rico
|2
|
|align="left"|
|
|- 

|-
!165
|Gilbert
|December 9, 2012
|WWC Lockout
|Bayamón, Puerto Rico
|4
|
|align="left"|
|
|- 

|-
!166
|Samson Walker 
|January 26, 2013
|House show
|Cataño, Puerto Rico
|1
|
|align="left"|Walker was awarded the title after Gilbert was not able to defend it.
|
|-
!167
|Chicano
|February 9, 2013
|House show
|Cataño, Puerto Rico
|1
|
|
|
|-
!168
|Samson Walker
|March 3, 2013
|House show
|Bayamón, Puerto Rico
|2
|
|
| 
|-
!169
| Chicano
|March 16, 2013
|WWC La Hora de la Verdad 2013
|Bayamón, Puerto Rico
|2
|
|align="left"|This was a Boxing Match in which Chicano defeated Samson Walker by knockout.
|
|-
!170
|El Bronco I
|July 27, 2013
|House Show
|Bayamón, Puerto Rico
|6
|
|
|
|-
!171
|Apolo
|November 16, 2013
|WWC Crossfire – Day 1
|Bayamón, Puerto Rico
|1
|
|
|
|-
!172
|TNT
|March 30, 2014
|WWC La Hora de la Verdad – Day 2
|Bayamón, Puerto Rico
|2
|
|
|
|- 

|-
!173
|TNT
|April 26, 2014
|House show
|Bayamón, Puerto Rico
|3
|
|align="left"|Defeated Apolo in rematch for the vacant title.
|
|-
!174
|Carlito Caribbean Cool
|July 19, 2014
|House show
|Bayamón, Puerto Rico
|1
|
|
|
|-
!175
|Gilbert
|October 10, 2014
|House show
|Yabucoa, Puerto Rico
|5
|
|
|
|-
!176
| Chicano
|October 25, 2014
|WWC Aniversario 41 – Day 2
|Caguas, Puerto Rico
|3
|
|
|
|-
!177
|Gilbert
|November 8, 2014
|House show
|Bayamón, Puerto Rico
|6
|
|
|
|-
!178
| Chicano
|December 6, 2014
|WWC Lockdown – Day 2 
|Bayamón, Puerto Rico
|4
|
|
|
|-
!179
|Ricardo Rodriguez
|January 24, 2015 
|WWC La Hora De La Verdad – Day 1
|Bayamón, Puerto Rico
|1
|
|
|
|-
!180
| Chicano
|February 21, 2015
|House show
|Bayamón, Puerto Rico
|5
|
|
|
|-
!181
|Member of La Revolución
|February 28, 2015
|House show
|Cataño, Puerto Rico
|1
|
|align="left"|
|
|-
!182
|Mike Mendoza
|May 16, 2015
|House show
|Isabela, Puerto Rico
|1
|
|
|
|-
!183
|Member of La Revolución
|August 1, 2015
|WWC Noche de Campeones – Day 1
|Bayamón, Puerto Rico
|2
|
|
|
|-
!184
|El Hijo de Ray González
|September 26, 2015
|WWC Aniversario 42 – Day 2 
|Bayamón, Puerto Rico
|1
|
|
|
|-
!185
|Joe Bravo 
|October 17, 2015
|House show
|Bayamón, Puerto Rico
|1
|
|
| 
|-
!186
|Miguel Pérez Jr.
|November 7, 2015
|WWC Lockout 2015 – Day 2
|Bayamón, Puerto Rico
|3
|
|
|
|-
!187
|Ángel Fashion
|January 23, 2016
|House show
|Bayamón, Puerto Rico
|1
|
|align="left"|
|
|-
!188
|El Sensacional Carlitos
|March 19, 2016
|House show
|Bayamón, Puerto Rico
|6
|
|align="left"|
|
|-
!189
|Ángel Fashion
|March 26, 2016
|House show
|Bayamón, Puerto Rico
|2
|
|
|
|-
!190
| Chicano
|May 28, 2016
|House show
|Bayamón, Puerto Rico
|6
|
|
|
|-
!191
|Mike Mendoza
|January 7, 2017
|WWC Superestrellas de la Lucha Libre Sabado
|Bayamón, Puerto Rico
|2
|
|align="left"|
|
|-
!192
|Lightning
|April 29, 2017
|House show
|Manatí, Puerto Rico
|1
|
|
|
|-
!193
|Gilbert
|August 5, 2017
|WWC Summer Madness 2017
|Bayamón, Puerto Rico
|7
|
|
|
|-
!194
|Chicano
|March 18, 2018
|WWC Camino A La Gloria – Day 1
|Dorado, Puerto Rico
|7
|
|
|
|-
!195
|Mighty Ursus
|March 31, 2018
|House Show
|Manatí, Puerto Rico
|1
|
|align="left"|Defeat Chicano and Thunder in a 3-way match.
|
|-
!196
|Lightning
|April 15, 2018
|House show
|Dorado, Puerto Rico
|2
|
|
|
|-
!197
|El Comandante
|August 15, 2018
|House Show
|Guaynabo, Puerto Rico
|1
|
|
|
|-
!198
|Chicano
|November 3, 2018
|House Show
|Guaynabo, Puerto Rico
|8
|
|align="left"|Defeat El Gran Armando, substituting for El Comandante, who is not present but cannot wrestle.
|
|-
!199
|Pedro Portillo III
|January 5, 2019
|WWC Euphoria
|Guaynabo, Puerto Rico
|1
|
|
|
|-
!200
|Bellito Calderón
|August 17, 2019
|WWC Anniversary
|Guaynabo, Puerto Rico
|1
|
|
|
|-
!201
|Mighty Ursus
|November 23, 2019
|WWC Noche de Campeones
|Bayamón, Puerto Rico
|2
|
|
|- 

|-
!202
|Bellito Calderón
|February 6, 2021
|WWC Cuentas Pendientes
|San Juan, Puerto Rico
|2
|
|align="left"|Defeated Pedro Portillo III to crown a new champion for the vacated title.
|
|-
!203
|Xavant
|July 30, 2021
|WWC House Show
|Caguas, Puerto Rico
|1
|
|
|
|-
!204
|Carlos Carlderón
|April 2, 2022
|WWC House Show
|Manatí, Puerto Rico
|3
|
|
|
|-
!205
|Nihan
|May 21, 2022
|WWC House Show
|Manatí, Puerto Rico
|1
|+
|
|
|}

Combined reigns 

{| class="wikitable sortable" style="text-align: center"
|-
!Rank
!Wrestler
!No. ofreigns
!Combineddays
|-
!1
| Carlos Colón || 9 || 1,382
|-
!2
| Invader I || 12 || 950
|-
!3
| Chicano || 8 || 742
|-
!4
| Gilbert ||| 7 || 659
|-
!5
| Huracán Castillo, Jr. || 7 || 628 
|-
!6
| Mighty Ursus || 2 || 610
|-
!7
| José Miguel Pérez || 4 || 608
|-
!8
|Ray González || 5 || 564
|-
!9
| Fire Blaze/Orlando Colon || 6 || 377
|-
!10
| King Tonga || 2 || 330
|-
!11
| Abdullah the Butcher || 3 || 323
|-
!12 
| Bellito Calderón || 3 || 321
|-
!13
| Héctor Guerrero || 1 || 310
|-
!14 
| Eric Embry || 2 || 301
|-
!15
| El Sensacional Carlitos || 6 || 299
|-
!16
| El Bronco I || 6 || 281
|-
!17
| Miguel Pérez Jr. || 3 || 260
|-
!18
| Xavant || 1 || 246
|-
!19
| Hercules Ayala || 5 || 245
|-
!20
| José Rivera, Jr. || 8 || 237
|-
!21
| Villano III || 2 || 225
|-
!22
| Ricky Santana || 5 || 206
|-
!23
| Kareem Muhammad || 1 || 190
|-
!rowspan=2|24
| Glamour Boy Shane || 3 || 189
|-
| Mighty Igor || 1 || 189
|-
!25
| Titán || 1 || 188
|-
!26
| Steve Corino || 1 || 182
|-
!27
| Jake Roberts || 1 || 183
|-
!28
| Mike Mendoza || 2 || 175
|-
!rowspan=2|29
| Eddie Colón || 5 || 174
|-
| Super Médico I || 3 || 174
|-
!30
| Manny Fernandez || 1 || 168
|-
!31
| BJ || 3 || 155
|-
!32
| Bob Sweetan || 1 || 153
|-
!33
| El Nene || 3 || 148
|-
!34
| Member of La Revolución || 2 || 140
|-
!35
| Apolo || 1 || 134
|-
!36
| Fidel Sierra || 3 || 133
|-
!37
| Don Kernodle || 1 || 130
|-
!rowspan=2|38
| José Rivera || 1 || 126
|-
| Tommy Diablo || 1 || 126
|-
!39
| TNT || 3 || 125
|-
!40
| Ángel Fashion || 2 || 119
|-
!41
| Chris Joel || 1 || 113
|-
!rowspan=2|42
| Jason the Terrible || 1 || 112
|-
| Victor The Bodyguard || 1 || 112
|-
!43
| style="background:#ffe6bd;"| Nihan || 1 || +
|-
!44
| Abudda Dein || 1 || 109
|-
!rowspan=3|45
| Dominican Boy || 1 || 105
|-
| Eric Alexander || 1 || 105
|-
| Lightning || 1 || 105
|-
!46
| Mohammed Hussein || 1 || 101
|-
!47
| Eric the Red || 1 || 98
|-
!48
| La Amenaza Bryan || 2 || 97
|-
!rowspan=2|49
| Rico Suave || 2 || 91
|-
| Tor Kamata || 1 || 91
|-
!rowspan=4|50
| Alex Montalvo || 2 || 84
|-
| Idol Stevens || 1 || 84
|-
| Ivan Koloff || 1 || 84
|-
| Super Black Ninja || 1 || 84
|-
!51
| Carlito Caribbean Cool || 1 || 83
|-
!rowspan=3|52
| Konga the Barbarian || 1 || 70
|-
| "Jumping" Jeff Jeffrey || 1 || 70
|-
| Tosh Togo || 1 || 70
|-
!53
| Black Gordman || 1 || 66
|-
!54
| Dory Funk Jr. || 1 || 63
|-
!55
| Harley Lewis || 1 || 57
|-
!56
| Brent Dail || 1 || 56
|-
!57
| Johnny Ringo || 1 || 55
|-
!58
| Abbad || 2 || 49
|-
!59
| Bobby Jaggers || 1 || 47
|-
!60
| Rex King || 1 || 43
|-
!rowspan=2|61
| Barrabás, Jr. || 1 || 42
|-
| Mustafa Saed || 1 || 42
|-
!62
| Al Perez || 1 || 38
|-
!rowspan=3|63
| Hideo Saito || 1 || 35
|-
| Huracán Castillo, Sr. || 1 || 35
|-
| Mongolian Stomper || 1 || 35
|-
!rowspan=5|64
| Samson Walker || 2 || 28
|-
| Kengo Kimura || 1 || 28
|-
| Ox Baker || 1 || 28
|-
| Ricardo Rodriguez || 1 || 28
|-
| Paul LeDuc || 1 || 28
|-
!rowspan=4|65
| Crazy Rudy || 1 || 21
|-
| El Hijo de Ray González || 1 || 21
|-
| Joe Bravo || 1 || 21
|-
| Jim Steele || 1 || 21
|-
!66
| Charles Evans || 1 || 20
|-
!rowspan=2|67
| Dr. Klodied || 1 || 14
|-
| Ash Rubinsky || 1 || 14
|-
!68
| Pampero Firpo || 1 || 11
|-
!69
| Heartthrob Romeo || 1 || 7
|-

References

External links
Wrestlingdata.com

World Wrestling Council championships
Heavyweight wrestling championships
Regional professional wrestling championships
State professional wrestling championships